Da'anshan Township is a township located inside of Fangshan District, Beijing, China. It borders Zhaitang Town and Datai Subdistrict to its north, Fozizhuang Township to its southeast, and Shijiaying Township to its southwest. Its total population was 2,871 in the 2020 census.

The name Da'anshan originated in the late Tang dynasty, when warlord Liu Rengong constructed Da'an Emporium around this region.

History

Administrative divisions 

In 2021, Da'anshan Township comprised one residential community and eight villages:

See also 
 List of township-level divisions of Beijing

References 

Fangshan District
Township-level divisions of Beijing